The term labial originates from Labium (Latin for "lip"), and is the adjective that describes anything of or related to lips, such as lip-like structures. Thus, it may refer to:
 the lips
 In linguistics, a labial consonant
 In zoology, the labial scales

 the labia (genitalia)

 Labial (gene), a gene in Drosophila melanogaster

See also